John Butler (born 1 November 1949) is an English former professional rugby league footballer. Born in St Helens, Butler began his career at Keighley, and went on to play for Rochdale Hornets, Salford, Wigan and St Helens. He also represented Lancashire and was selected for the 1974 British Lions tour of Australia and New Zealand.

Career
In April 1973, he was signed by Rochdale Hornets for a fee of £1,000.

In February 1974, he played for Rochdale in the final of the 1973–74 League Cup against Warrington. He was substituted at half time after suffering a hip injury, and Rochdale went on to lose the game 16–27.

In March 1975, Butler and his teammate Bill Sheffield were signed by Salford for a joint fee of £8,000. Butler went on win the 1976 League Championship with Salford. In 1979, he was signed by Wigan for a fee of £15,000. He finished his career with his hometown club, St Helens Heritage no 950.

Butler is son of former St Helens Heritage no 423 and Keighley star Jack Butler. He is the Father of former Chorley Lynx, Marseille XIII and Swinton Lions player Daniel Butler.

References

External links
Saints Heritage Society profile

1949 births
Living people
English rugby league players
Keighley Cougars players
Lancashire rugby league team players
Leigh Leopards players
London Broncos players
Rochdale Hornets players
Rugby league locks
Rugby league five-eighths
Rugby league players from St Helens, Merseyside
St Helens R.F.C. players
Salford Red Devils players
Wigan Warriors players